A list of films produced in Italy in 1971 (see 1971 in film):

References

Footnotes

Sources

External links
Italian films of 1971 at the Internet Movie Database

1971
Films
Lists of 1971 films by country or language